The 2007 FIBA Africa Women's Clubs Champions Cup (13th edition), was an international basketball tournament  held in Maputo, Mozambique, from October 19 to 28, 2007. The tournament, organized by FIBA Africa and hosted by Clube Ferroviário de Maputo, was contested by 11 clubs split into 2 groups of 6, each group playing a round robin with the top four teams of each group qualifying for the knockout stages. This was Desp de Maputo's 1st title and Mozambique's 3rd.
 
The tournament was won by Desportivo de Maputo from Mozambique.

Draw

Squads

Preliminary rounds 

Times given below are in UTC+2.

Group A

Group B

Knockout stage

9–11th place

Quarter finals

9th place

5–8th place

Semifinals

7th place

5th place

Bronze medal game
{{basketballbox|bg=#eee
 | date = 28 October 2007 | time = 17:00 | report = [ Boxscore]
 | teamA = ISPU  | scoreA = 56
 | teamB =  Fer Maputo | scoreB = 63 |Q1= 9-13 |Q2= 15-11 |Q3= 16-16 |Q4= 16-23 |points1= Amélia, Azinheira 14 |rebounds1= Amélia 4 |assist1= Amélia 3
 |points2= Gimo 15 |rebounds2= Zinóbia 6 |assist2= five players 2
 | place = Pavilhão do Desportivo de Maputo, Maputo | attendance = | referee = | series = 
}}

Gold medal game 

Final standings Desportivo de Maputo roster'''Anabela Cossa, Anta Sy, Cátia Halar, Crichúlia Monjane, Diara Dessai, Josefina Jafar, Luísa Nhate, Nádia Rodrigues, Odélia Mafanela, Salimata Diatta, Sílvia Neves, Valerdina Manhonga, Coach: Nazir Salé

All Tournament Team

See also 
 2007 FIBA Africa Championship for Women

References

External links 
 2007 FIBA Africa Champions Cup Official Website
 FIBA Africa official website

2007 FIBA Africa Women's Clubs Champions Cup
FIBA Africa Women's Clubs Champions Cup
FIBA Africa Women's Clubs Champions Cup
FIBA
FIBA Africa Women's Clubs Champions Cup